William Murphy was an American film actor active from the 1940s through the 1970s.

A long-time friend of John Wayne and Robert Mitchum, Williams also spent many nights with Elvis Presley and his entourage the "Memphis Mafia". He reportedly regarded Hollywood as "an open invitation to party all night long".

Played “Lt. Edlridge” on "Gunsmoke" in the 1959 episode “Blue Horse” (S4E38).

Death
Murphy died on November 6, 1989, in Los Angeles, California at the age of 67. He had 6 children and was married once.

Filmography

References
Guralnick, Peter. Careless Love: The Unmaking of Elvis Presley, p. 72.

External links

American male film actors
1922 births
1989 deaths
20th-century American male actors